Dynamic Shooting Sport Federation of Hungary, Hungarian Magyar Dinamikus Lövészsport Szövetség, is the Hungarian association for practical shooting under the International Practical Shooting Confederation (IPSC) as well as precision rifle shooting under International Precision Rifle Federation (IPRF) and metallic silhouette shooting under the International Metallic Silhouette Shooting Union (IMSSU).

References 

Regions of the International Practical Shooting Confederation
Practical Shooting